Qamran Iqbal (born 17 October 2001) is an Indian cricketer. He made his first-class debut for Jammu & Kashmir in the 2018–19 Ranji Trophy on 22 December 2018. He played for the India U19 cricket team in 2018 and 2019.

He made his List A debut on 24 September 2019, for Jammu and Kashmir in the 2019–20 Vijay Hazare Trophy. He made his Twenty20 debut on 10 January 2021, for Jammu and Kashmir in the 2020–21 Syed Mushtaq Ali Trophy.

References

External links
 

2001 births
Living people
Indian cricketers
Jammu and Kashmir cricketers
People from Srinagar